Sheikh Khalifa bin Duaij bin Khalifa bin Muhammad bin Isa Al Khalifa is a Bahraini politician. He has led the Court of the Crown Prince since 2005.

References

Bahraini politicians
House of Khalifa
Year of birth missing (living people)
Living people
Place of birth missing (living people)